Lieutenant-General Sir William George Holmes  (20 August 1892 – 16 January 1969) was a senior British Army officer who fought with distinction in the First World War. He later served in the Second World War, where he commanded the 42nd (East Lancashire) Infantry Division during the Battle of France in May/June 1940.

Early life and First World War
Holmes was educated at Gresham's School, Holt, and the Royal Military College, Sandhurst. Upon graduating from Sandhurst, Holmes was commissioned as a second lieutenant into the Royal Welsh Fusiliers on 11 October 1911. He served with his regiment, mainly the 1st Battalion, throughout the First World War, during which he was mentioned in despatches four times and received the DSO and bar, and the Italian Silver Medal of Military Valor, commanding his regiment's 1st Battalion on the Italian Front from 1917 to 1918. He received rapid promotion during the war, being promoted to captain in December 1914, temporary major in May 1916, and ending as an acting lieutenant-colonel, to which he was promoted on 10 December 1918, making him, at the age of just 26, one of the youngest of his rank in the British Army.

The citation for his DSO reads:

Between the wars
In 1921 he served in Waziristan and later returned to the United Kingdom and became adjutant of the 6th Battalion, RWF, a Territorial Army (TA) formation serving as part of the 158th Brigade of the 53rd (Welsh) Infantry Division, from 12 March 1923. He relinquished the appointment on 12 September upon transferring to the East Lancashire Regiment. He attended the Staff College, Camberley, from 1928 to 1929, alongside fellow students like Gerald Templer, John Harding, Richard McCreery and Alexander Galloway.

In 1933 Holmes became CO of the 2nd Battalion, East Lancashire Regiment. Promoted to colonel the same year, he was given a general staff position in the Northern Command in 1934 and, promoted to the temporary rank of brigadier on 1 October 1935, was given command of the 8th Infantry Brigade, part of the 3rd Infantry Division. On 14 June 1937, at the age of 44, Holmes became the British Army's youngest major-general, and after spending a period on half-pay, on 1 March 1938 got his first divisional command, the 42nd (East Lancashire) Infantry Division, a TA formation.

Second World War
Holmes commanded the 42nd Division in France in 1940 with the British Expeditionary Force (BEF).

Following the fall of France and the retreat and evacuation from Dunkirk, Holmes was promoted to lieutenant-general and given command of the newly formed X Corps, commanding it in Syria and North Africa in June 1940.

In November 1941 Holmes became General Officer Commanding the British Troops in Egypt, in addition to his responsibilities as commander of X Corps. In August 1942 he became General-Director of Transportation at the War Office. Holmes's last command was the Ninth Army, based in Palestine and Transjordan, a command he held from September 1942 until his retirement in 1945.

Honours
1917: Distinguished Service Order
1918: Silver Medal of Military Valour (Italy)
1938: Companion of the Order of the Bath
1944: Order of the Phoenix, Class II (Greece)
1944: Knight Commander of the Order of the British Empire
1945: Order of Polonia Restituta, Class II (Poland)

References

Bibliography

External links
Generals of World War II

|-
 

|-

|-

1892 births
1969 deaths
British Army lieutenant generals
British Army generals of World War II
British Army personnel of World War I
Commanders with Star of the Order of Polonia Restituta
Companions of the Distinguished Service Order
Companions of the Order of the Bath
East Lancashire Regiment officers
Graduates of the Royal Military College, Sandhurst
Graduates of the Staff College, Camberley
Grand Commanders of the Order of the Phoenix (Greece)
Knights Commander of the Order of the British Empire
Military personnel from London
People educated at Gresham's School
People from Westminster
Recipients of the Silver Medal of Military Valor
Royal Welch Fusiliers officers
War Office personnel in World War II